William Crosby may refer to:

 William G. Crosby (1805–1881), American politician and former Governor of Maine
 William Holmes Crosby Jr. (1914–2005), doctor, inventor and poet, considered a founding fathers of modern hematology
 William Otis Crosby (1850–1925), American geologist and engineer
 Bill Crosby (politician) (born 1937), American politician in the South Carolina House of Representatives
 William C. Crosby, American tennis player in U.S. Pro Tennis Championships draws, 1946–1967

See also 
 Bill Cosby (born 1937), American comedian and actor